Cegelnica is a formerly independent settlement south of Žužemberk in southeast Slovenia. It is now part of the village of Stavča Vas. It belongs to the Municipality of Žužemberk. It is part of the traditional region of Lower Carniola and is now included with the rest of the municipality in the Southeast Slovenia Statistical Region.

Geography
Cegelnica lies south of the Krka River in an area with many sinkholes. Šica Creek flows south of the settlement, but it is dry except during rainy periods. It has its source at Boben Cave. Primož Hill rises south of Cegelnica.

Name
The name Cegelnica and its German counterpart Ziegelstatt mean 'brickworks'. The name refers to a brickworks that formerly operated at the site.

History
Cegelnica was annexed by Stavča Vas in 1953, ending its existence as an independent settlement.

References

External links

Cegelnica on Geopedia

Populated places in the Municipality of Žužemberk
Former settlements in Slovenia